Theodosia, Lady Bagot,  ( Leslie; 1865 – 21 February 1940) was a British nurse, benefactor and author. She founded and served in field hospitals during the Second Boer War, the First Balkan War, and the First World War, for which she was awarded a number of British and foreign decorations. 
A devout Christian, she was active in the Anglican Church Army.

Biography
She founded the Portland Hospital and accompanied it to South Africa during the Boer War, for which she was awarded the Royal Red Cross. She had little nursing experience herself, but learnt on the job during her time in South Africa and became particularly skilled on the surgical wards. In 1901, her book Shadows of the War, a narrative of experiences and impressions of the war, was published. She served with a surgical unit in Serbia during the First Balkan War, for which she was awarded the Serbian Order of the Red Cross. During the First World War, she organised a hospital for the French army in Caen in 1914, and then a hospital for the Belgian Army in 1915: she was awarded two British war medals and the Belgian Queen Elisabeth Medal for her war service. A devout Christian, she was Vice-President of Church Army Council in 1927.

On 19 June 1885, she married Josceline Bagot, a British Army offer and later politician, at St Mark's Church, Mayfair. Together they had four children: one son and three daughters. Josceline died in 1913, and she went on to marry the Revd Sidney Swann in 1920.

In 1900, Bagot was mentioned in despatches by Lord Roberts in relation to service during the Second Boer War. She was appointed a Lady of Grace of the Venerable Order of Saint John (DStJ) in July 1901.

Selected works

Gallery

References

External links
 

1865 births
1940 deaths
Members of the Royal Red Cross
British Anglicans
People of the Second Boer War
World War I nurses
Female nurses in World War I
Church Army people
British nursing administrators